Begum Jaan is a Pakistani drama film directed by Hassan Tariq and is the remake of director's own Neend (1959). Rani played the titular role of Begum Jaan in the film opposite Shahid while Qavi Khan, Aurangzeb and Rangeela appeared in supporting roles. The music of the film was composed by A. Hameed with lyrics by Qateel Shifai. The film released on 23 June 1977 and was a box office hit. It revolves around a pathan woman who goes door to door to sell clothes, and later gives birth to an illegitimate child. Despite allowing a countrywide theatrical release, it was censored and didn't release in some areas.

Plot 

The film revolves around Begum Jaan, a salesperson who sells smuggled clothes by going home to home. She is smitten by a wealthy man of the city, Seth Shahid who impresses her by acting as a pious man in front of her. Begum Jaan impresses by him and dreams of being marry to him some day. However, the wholesaler of Begum Jaan Khasta Gul Khan wants to marry her.

One day, Begum Shaan becomes nervous as a police inspector chases her. She hides the clothes (that she sells) to which inspector suspects her of buying smuggled clothes and inspector takes her to Police station. Inspector Aftab's brother, Amjad who is a column writer of a newspaper and is in police station at that time decides to figure out all the matter. He finds that Begum Jaan is innocent, she just sells it from taking it from her wholesaler and many rich people are also involved in it as they buy the clothes.

Begum Jaan one day goes to Seth Shahid's house where he assaults her and later promises to marry her. She then makes Khasta Gul Khan arrest by complaining about his smuggling to Police. She then decides to sell Pakistani clothes, which no one is ready to buy. She goes to Shahid who gives her some rupees as her clothes are not selling these days. Later, it reveals to the whole neighbourhood of Begum Jaan that she is pregnant without marriage. Amjad also arrives there and decides to do her justice. He goes to Seth Shahid's house with her and asks him to atone his sins to which he denies. They then report the case in police station and Shahid is then arrested and is presented to court. Shahid's lawyer states in the court that Begum Jaan is a characterless girl to which Begum Jaan presents Khasta Gul Khan as her witness because he was arrested due to her complain and also witness of her character. Khasta Gul Khan lies in the court as he is angry of Begum Jaan due to his imprisonment and Begum Jaan loses the case. After losing the case, Begum Jaan decides to take revenge himself and shoots the Seth Shahid. She then renders herself to police due to his crime.

After serving a sentence of years, she leaves the jail with her young son from Shahid. When she leaves the jail, Amjad stands there to whom she asks why he is behind her since years, What is their relation, to which he replies that they are related to each other due to humanity and truth.

Cast 

 Rani as Begum Jaan
 Shahid as Seth Shahid
 Aurnagzeb as Aftab
 Qavi Khan as Amjad
 Rnageela as Khasta Gul Khan
 Bindiya as Rossie
 Bahar Begum
 Albela
 Jamshed Ansari

Soundtrack

References 

1970s Urdu-language films
Remakes of Pakistani films
Pakistani drama films
Urdu-language Pakistani films